Clinton Township may refer to:

Illinois
 Clinton Township, DeKalb County, Illinois

Indiana
 Clinton Township, Boone County, Indiana
 Clinton Township, Cass County, Indiana
 Clinton Township, Decatur County, Indiana
 Clinton Township, Elkhart County, Indiana
 Clinton Township, LaPorte County, Indiana
 Clinton Township, Putnam County, Indiana
 Clinton Township, Vermillion County, Indiana

Iowa
 Clinton Township, Linn County, Iowa
 Clinton Township, Ringgold County, Iowa
 Clinton Township, Sac County, Iowa
 Clinton Township, Wayne County, Iowa

Kansas
 Clinton Township, Douglas County, Kansas

Michigan
 Clinton Township, Lenawee County, Michigan
 Clinton Township, Macomb County, Michigan
 Clinton Township, Oscoda County, Michigan

Minnesota
 Clinton Township, Rock County, Minnesota
 Clinton Township, St. Louis County, Minnesota

Missouri
 Clinton Township, Clinton County, Missouri
 Clinton Township, Douglas County, Missouri, in Douglas County, Missouri
 Clinton Township, Henry County, Missouri
 Clinton Township, Texas County, Missouri

New Jersey
 Clinton Township, New Jersey, in Hunterdon County
 Clinton Township, Essex County, New Jersey, defunct

North Dakota
 Clinton Township, Divide County, North Dakota

Ohio
 Clinton Township, Franklin County, Ohio
 Clinton Township, Fulton County, Ohio
 Clinton Township, Knox County, Ohio
 Clinton Township, Seneca County, Ohio
 Clinton Township, Shelby County, Ohio
 Clinton Township, Vinton County, Ohio
 Clinton Township, Wayne County, Ohio

Pennsylvania
 Clinton Township, Butler County, Pennsylvania
 Clinton Township, Lycoming County, Pennsylvania
 Clinton Township, Venango County, Pennsylvania
 Clinton Township, Wayne County, Pennsylvania
 Clinton Township, Wyoming County, Pennsylvania

South Dakota
 Clinton Township, Miner County, South Dakota, in Miner County, South Dakota

Township name disambiguation pages